Phebalium glandulosum, commonly known as desert phebalium, is a species of shrub that is endemic to eastern Australia. It has glandular-warty stems covered with silvery to rust-coloured scales, wedge-shaped leaves that are scaly on the lower surface, and yellow flowers arranged in umbels on the ends of branchlets.

Description
It has glandular-warty stems that are densely covered with silvery to rust-coloured scales.

Taxonomy
The species was first formally described  by English botanist William Jackson Hooker in Thomas Mitchell's Journal of an Expedition into the Interior of Tropical Australia in 1848.

In 1970, Peter G. Wilson described three subspecies of P. glandulosum in the journal Nuytsia, a further subspecies in 1998 in the same journal and in 2008 Robyn L. Giles described a further three in Australian Systematic Botany. The names of the six subspecies are accepted at the Australian Plant Census:

P. glandulosum subsp. angustifolium Paul G.Wilson (N.S.W.)
P. glandulosum subsp. eglandulosum (Blakely) Paul G.Wilson (Qld., N.S.W.)
P. glandulosum  Hook. subsp. glandulosum (Qld., N.S.W.)
P. glandulosum subsp. macrocalyx R.L.Giles (S.A., Qld., N.S.W., Vic.)
P. glandulosum subsp. nitidum Paul G.Wilson (N.S.W.)
P. glandulosum subsp. riparium R.L.Giles (Vic., N.S.W.)

Distribution and habitat
Phebalium glandulosum is widespread in heath, forest and mallee and occurs in Queensland, New South Wales, Victoria and South Australia.
 Subspecies angustifolium is mainly found in the Wollemi National Park in New South Wales.
 Subspecies eglandulosum is restricted to heath between granite rocks in the Torrington district in New South Wales and near Thulimbah in south-eastern Queensland.
 Subspecies glandulosum occurs in southern Queensland, inland New South Wales and southern South Australia.
 Subspecies macrocalyx grows in mallee woodland in western New South Wales, and in north-western Victoria where it is considered to be endangered.
 Subspecies nitidum is restricted to the Warrumbungles in north-western New South Wales where it grows on rocky basalt slopes.
 Subspecies riparium, commonly known as Snowy River phebalium, grows on rocky slopes and near streams in the Snowy Mountains, especially near the gorges of the Snowy River in Victoria and New South Wales.

References

Flora of New South Wales
Flora of Queensland
Flora of South Australia
Flora of Victoria (Australia)
glandulosum
Plants described in 1848
Taxa named by William Jackson Hooker